Stephen Warboys (born 25 October 1953) is a retired right-handed British tennis player. Warboys was a runner up at Junior Wimbledon in 1971.

Junior Grand Slam finals

Singles: 1

References

External links
 
 

British male tennis players
Living people
1953 births
Place of birth missing (living people)